Zainab Nagin Cox (born 1965) is a spacecraft operations engineer at Jet Propulsion Laboratory. Asteroid 14061 was named "Nagincox" after her in 2015. She has received the NASA Exceptional Service Medal.

Early life and education 
Cox was born in Bangalore. She grew up in Kuala Lumpur and Kansas City, Kansas. She went to school at Shawnee Mission East High School. At school she was interested in Star Trek and Cosmos: A Spacetime Odyssey. She studied engineering and psychology at Cornell University, graduating in 1986. She earned a master's degree in space operations systems engineering from Air Force Institute of Technology in 1990.

Career 

After graduating, Cox worked for the United States Air Force as a space operations officer. She worked in F-16 aircrew training. She worked as an orbital analyst at North American Aerospace Defense Command. Cox has worked as a spacecraft operations engineer at Jet Propulsion Laboratory since 1993. She has been involved with several interplanetary robotic missions, including Galileo, InSight, Kepler, and Mars Curiosity. She is a tactical mission lead, in charge of the uplink, downlink and advance planning teams. Asteroid 14061 Nagincox, discovered in 1996, was named after her in 2015. She won the NASA Exceptional Service Medal, the Bruce Murray award in 2014 and has won the NASA Exceptional Achievement Medal twice.

Public engagement and diversity 
Cox is passionate about increasing diversity within sciences, engineering and NASA. She served on the board of directors at Griffith Observatory. She serves on the President's Council for Cornell Women Alumni. She is an invited speaker for the United States Department of State, travelling the world talking about her career and NASA's robotic space exploration program. In 2014 she visited Pakistan, Rio de Janeiro and Bahia, inspiring young women from unprivileged communities to study sciences and engineering. She was a keynote speaker at SIGGRAPH 2016. She visited Bosnia and Herzegovina in 2016, touring the country with the United States Department of State. She gave a TEDx talk at Beacon Street in 2017, which was later chosen by Wired as one of the best science talks. "What time is it on Mars?" has been viewed almost two million times. She visited Kuwait in 2018, discussing their 2021 Mars mission.

References

External links 

American aerospace engineers
Indian aerospace engineers
20th-century Indian physicists
Cornell University alumni
Air Force Institute of Technology alumni
Indian women engineers
Engineers from Karnataka
Women scientists from Karnataka
20th-century Indian women scientists
20th-century women engineers
Scientists from Bangalore